Vigleik Storaas (born 2 February 1963) is a Norwegian jazz pianist and composer, and the younger brother of composer and bassist Gaute Storaas. He is known from a series of album releases and collaborations with jazz musicians such as Norma Winstone, Karin Krog, Terje Rypdal, Niels-Henning Ørsted Pedersen, Chet Baker, Jack DeJohnette and Warne Marsh.

Career
Storås was born in Bergen, and studied music at the U-Phils High School in Bergen before attending the Jazz program at Trondheim Musikkonservatorium (1982–84), what today is the Department of Music Technology (NTNU), where he was the leader of the Bodega Band (1990–1996), and is now Assistant Professor.

During the 1980s, Storaas played with the bands Kråbøl, Søyr, Bjørn Alterhaug Band and Fair Play, and was the bandleader of the group Lines (1987–92). With the Bjørn Alterhaug Quintet he played at the Molde International Jazz Festival 2012. During 1992 to 1995 Storaas joined the international jazz profiles Karin Krog and John Surman, and he participated on the record Nordic Quartet from 1994. Here he was recognised as composer both in Norway and internationally. Storaas created his own trio in 1992 with fellow students Johannes Eick and Per Oddvar Johansen; this trio has made several recordings. More recently he has performed in a quartet with students (at NTNU) Tore Johansen (trumpet), Rune Nergaard (bass) and Gard Nilssen (drums).

Storaas has toured for the Rikskonsertene with the "Musikk for fred" (1984–86), "So Ro Godt Barn" (1987–90), "Mennesket i Mengden" (1989–90), "Fair Play" (1989), "All That Jazz" (1993), "Kombinasjoner" (1995) and "Meeting Point" (1997 and 2000), and was named Jazz Musician of the Year by the Association of Norwegian Jazz Musicians in 1996. In 1999 he performed commissioned work Mosaic at Vossajazz, The International Jazz Festival at Voss, Norway. Albums under his own name are Bilder (1995), Andre Bilder (1997), both received Spellemannprisen (The Norwegian Grammy Award), Open Excursions (1999) and Subsonic (2002).

Honors

Spellemannprisen 1995 in the class jazz for the album Bilder (Vigleik Storaas Trio)
Jazz Musician of the Year 1996, by the Association of Norwegian Jazz Musicians
Spellemannprisen 1997 in the class jazz for the album Andre bilder (Vigleik Storaas Trio)
Gammleng-prisen 2002 in the class jazz

Discography

Solo projects 
Solo Piano
1999: Open Excursions, (Curling Legs)

As band leader with Lines (Quartet with Tore Brunborg, Olaf Kamfjord and Trond Kopperud)
1989: Lines, (Odin Records), feat. Elin Rosseland
1993: Far To Go, (Grappa Music), feat. Norma Winstone

As band leader with Vigleik Storaas Trio
1995: Bilder, (Curling Legs)
1997: Andre Bilder, (Curling Legs)
2002: Subsonic, (Curling Legs)
2007: Now, (Inner Ear)
2012: Epistel#5 (Inner Ear)

As band leader with Vigleik Storaas Septet
2010: Open Ears (Inner Ear)

Collaborative works 
As band leader with Trondheim Jazz Orchestra
2006: Tribute composed by Storaas to the 25th anniversary for The Jazz Program in 2004, (MNJ Records)

Piano duets with Ivar Antonsen
2010: Dialogues (Ponca Jazz Records/Musikkoperatørene), nominated for the Spellemannprisen 2010 in the class Jazz

Within Excess Luggage (Trio with Steinar Nickelsen and Håkon Mjåset Johansen)
2007: Excess Luggage (Park Grammofon)
2011: Hand Luggage Only

With Tore Johansen, Jo Skaansar, and Jon Christensen
2012: Double Rainbow (Inner Ear)

With Tor Yttredal
2015: Chamber (Inner Ear)
2017: Space In Between (Inner Ear)

With Hegge
2017: Vi är ledsna men du får inte längre vara barn (Particular Recordings Collective)

As sideman
1983: Hotellsuite (Odin Records), with Espen Rud
1984: Cierny Peter (Odin Records), within Søyr
1986: A Ballad (Ponca Jazz) within Bjørn Alterhaug Quintet
1992: En Flik Av ... (Studentersamfundet i Trondheim), within Bodega Band
1995: Nordic Quartet (ECM Records), with Nordic Quartet (John Surman, Karin Krog and Terje Rypdal)
1997: Pieces of Time (Curling Legs), with Jacob Young
1998: Rudlende (Curling Legs), with Espen Rud
1999: Glow (Curling Legs) with Jacob Young
2001: My shining hour (Blue Jersey), with Kjersti Stubø
2001: Baritone Landscape (Gemini Records), within John Pål Inderberg's The Zetting
2005: Sval Draum (Taurus Records), with John Pål Inderberg
2006: Rainbow Session (Inner Ear), with Tore Johansen and Ole Morten Vågan
2006: Deloo (Grappa Music), with Kirsti Huke
2007: Implicity (AIM), with Orange (Trio with Sondre Meisfjord & Stig Rennestraum)
2008: Oslo Calling (Meantime Records), with Karin Krog and The Meantimes
2009: Songlines (Ponca Jazz Records), within Bjørn Alterhaug Quintet
2009: Kirsti Huke – (Fairplay), with Kirsti Huke
2010: My Sister Said (Turn Left), with Håvard Lund
2012: Vegen Åt Deg (Øra Fonogram – OF036), with Heidi Skjerve.

Tours with Rikskonsertene
"Musikk for fred" (1984–86),
"So Ro Godt Barn" (1987–90),
"Mennesket i Mengden" (1989–90),
"Fair Play" (1989),
"All That Jazz" (1993),
"Kombinasjoner" (1995),
"Meeting Point" (1997 og 2000).

References

External links 

Tore Johansen, Vigleik Storaas & Ole Morten Vågan – I Get Along Without You Very Well on YouTube

20th-century Norwegian pianists
21st-century Norwegian pianists
Norwegian music educators
Norwegian jazz pianists
Norwegian jazz composers
Ponca Jazz Records artists
Odin Records artists
Curling Legs artists
Grappa Music artists
Inner Ear artists
ECM Records artists
Spellemannprisen winners
Norwegian University of Science and Technology alumni
Musicians from Bergen
Living people
1963 births